Mikkel Krogh Damsgaard (born 3 July 2000) is a Danish professional footballer who plays as a winger for Premier League club Brentford and the Denmark national team.

Club career

Early career
Damsgaard started playing football in his hometown Jyllinge, where he played for eight years, with his father as his coach. During a game with Jyllinge FC, Damsgaard was spotted by a scout from Nordsjælland, who was out actually looking for another player, but ended up contacting Damsgaard. He then joined FC Nordsjælland as a U12 player on a youth contract until 2020.

Nordsjælland
On 27 September 2017, Damsgaard made his official debut for Nordsjælland at the age of 17. He played the whole game against Vejgaard BK in a Danish Cup game, making one assist in a 4–0 win at Soffy Road.

He made his Danish Superliga debut for Nordsjælland on 26 November 2017 in a game against AC Horsens in shirt number 27.

On 12 July 2018, Damsgaard made his European debut for Nordsjælland against Cliftonville in a Europa League qualifier.

Sampdoria
On 6 February 2020, it was confirmed that Damsgaard had signed a four-year contract with Italian Serie A club Sampdoria with effect from 1 July 2020. The transfer fee was estimated at €6.7 million (DKK 50 million). On 17 October 2020, he scored his first Serie A goal in a 3–0 victory against Lazio.

Brentford
On 10 August 2022, Damsgaard joined English Premier League club Brentford for a €15 million fee on a five-year deal.

International career
On 21 June 2021, Damsgaard scored a goal in a 4–1 win over Russia in the UEFA Euro 2020, to become the youngest Danish player to score at the European Championship, aged 20 years 353 days. In the Euro 2020 semi-finals, he scored the first goal against England with the tournament's only freekick goal. However Denmark eventually lost 2–1 after extra-time.

Career statistics

Club

International

Scores and results list Denmark's goal tally first, score column indicates score after each Damsgaard goal.

References

External links
 
 

2000 births
Living people
People from Roskilde Municipality
Sportspeople from Region Zealand
Association football wingers
Association football forwards
Danish men's footballers
FC Nordsjælland players
U.C. Sampdoria players
Brentford F.C. players
Danish Superliga players
Serie A players
Premier League players
Denmark international footballers
Denmark under-21 international footballers
Denmark youth international footballers
UEFA Euro 2020 players
2022 FIFA World Cup players
Danish expatriate men's footballers
Expatriate footballers in Italy
Expatriate footballers in England
Danish expatriate sportspeople in Italy
Danish expatriate sportspeople in England